Mauro Daniel Goicoechea Furia (born 27 March 1988) is a Uruguayan professional footballer who plays as a goalkeeper for Uruguayan Primera División team Danubio.

Club career

Danubio FC
Goicochea was born in Montevideo. In 2006, he signed his first professional contract with Danubio. Thanks to his good performances, he became the goalkeeper holder and his number was changed to 1. He played a total of 79 games with the club.

Roma
In August 2012, Goicoechea moved to A.S. Roma on a loan until the end of the season. He made his debut in a 3–2 loss against Parma in the second half, coming on as a substitute for the injured Maarten Stekelenburg. Goicoechea followed this up with an impressive display in a 4–1 victory over Palermo. He then started the following six games, against Lazio, Torino, Pescara and Siena, but following a string of unimpressive results and Zdeněk Zeman's sacking, which included an awful, ridiculous own goal in Zeman's last day in charge against Cagliari, where he dropped an easy catch inside the net, Stekelenburg was reinstated as the primary goalkeeper.

Oțelul Galați
In January 2014, Goicoechea signed a two-and-a-half-year contract with the Romanian club Oțelul Galați.

Arouca
In May 2014, Goicoechea moved clubs again, signing a two-year deal with Portuguese side Arouca. He made his debut on 18 August in a 1–1 home draw with Estoril.

Toulouse
On 14 July 2015, Goicoechea signed for Ligue 1 side Toulouse.

International career
Goicoechea was part of the Uruguayan team at the 2005 FIFA U-17 World Championship, and Uruguay U20 team in the 2007 FIFA U-20 World Cup where they reached the round of 16. In this side he had teammates such as Edinson Cavani, Luis Suárez and Martín Cáceres among others.

References

External links
 
 
 

1988 births
Living people
Footballers from Montevideo
Association football goalkeepers
Uruguayan footballers
Uruguay under-20 international footballers
Uruguayan expatriate footballers
Uruguayan Primera División players
Danubio F.C. players
Serie A players
A.S. Roma players
Liga I players
ASC Oțelul Galați players
Primeira Liga players
F.C. Arouca players
Ligue 1 players
Toulouse FC players
Uruguayan expatriate sportspeople in Portugal
Expatriate footballers in Italy
Expatriate footballers in Romania
Expatriate footballers in Portugal
Expatriate footballers in France

Uruguayan sportspeople of Italian descent